The Karabakh carpet or Karabagh carpet, is one of the varieties of carpets of Transcaucasia, made in the bi-national Karabakh region.

History
Carpet-weaving was historically a traditional profession for the female population of Karabakh, including many Armenian families, though there were prominent Karabakh carpet weavers among men too. The oldest extant Armenian carpet from the region, referred to as Artsakh since antiquity and during the medieval period, is from the village of Banants (near Gandzak, Armenia) and dates to the early thirteenth century. The first time that the Armenian word for pile carpet, gorg, was mentioned was in a 1242–43 Armenian inscription on the wall of the Kaptavan Church in Artsakh, whereas the Armenian word for "carpet" was first used in the fifth-century Armenian translation of the Bible.

Carpet-weaving in Karabakh especially developed in the second half of the nineteenth century, when the population of many areas in Karabakh was engaged in carpet-weaving, mainly for commercial sale purposes. At this time Shusha became the center of Karabakh carpet-weaving.

Types

Armenian

Art historian Hravard Hakobyan notes that "Artsakh carpets occupy a special place in the history of Armenian carpet-making." Common themes and patterns found on Armenian carpets include dragons and eagles. They were diverse in style, rich in color and ornamental motifs, and were even separated into categories depending on what sort of animals were depicted on them, such as artsvagorgs (eagle-carpets), vishapagorgs (dragon-carpets) and otsagorgs (serpent-carpets). The rug mentioned in the Kaptavan inscription is composed of three arches, "covered with vegetative ornaments", and bears an artistic resemblance to the illuminated manuscripts produced in Artsakh.

That the art of carpet weaving was intimately tied to the making of curtains is indicated in a passage by Kirakos Gandzaketsi, a thirteenth-century Armenian historian from Artsakh, who praised Arzu-Khatun, the wife of regional prince Vakhtang Khachenatsi, and her daughters for their dexterous skills in weaving.

Azerbaijan

The Karabakh carpet school—also rendered as Qarabagh carpet—developed in two areas: in lowland and mountainous parts of Karabakh. The last one often and the most renowned one is often called “the Shusha carpet group”. Besides Shusha, the surrounding villages of Dashbulag, Dovshanly, Girov, Terniviz, Malibayli, Chanakcha, Tun, Tuglar, Hadrut, Muradkhanly, Gasimushagi, Gubately, Gozag, Mirseid, Bagirbeyli, Khanlig, Tutmas were also known for their rugs. Each village developed original design and ornaments and had specific characterization which distinguished them from one village to another. In the lowlands carpet manufacturing was based in Jabrayil, Horadiz, Barda and Agdam (most notably, Lambaran village).

Carpet-weaving in Karabakh especially developed beginning from the second half of the 19th century, when the population of many areas in Karabakh was engaged in carpet-weaving, mainly for commercial sale. At this time Shusha became the center of the Karabakh carpet-weaving. Karabakh and Shusha carpets have greatly influenced the Nakhchivan and Zangezur schools of carpets. Some experts actually consider these schools to be sub-categories of the Karabakh carpet school. Shusha's carpet-weavers, Meshedi Bayram Gurban-oglu, Djabbar Haji Akber-oglu, Fatima Aga Sherif-gizi, Ahmed Dashdamir-oglu participated and were awarded prizes in an international show in Paris in 1867. Shusha carpets also received awards in 1872 in Moscow Polytechnic Exhibition.

The Azerbaijani-style carpet making is part of UNESCO's Masterpieces of Intangible Heritage.

See also
 Armenian carpet
 Azerbaijan Carpet Museum
 Latif Karimov
 Vidadi Muradov

Notes

Further reading
 

Republic of Artsakh culture
Armenian culture
Azerbaijani culture
Azerbaijani rugs and carpets
Masterpieces of the Oral and Intangible Heritage of Humanity
Armenian rugs and carpets
National symbols of Azerbaijan
Karabakh